Neodymium(II) chloride or neodymium dichloride is a chemical compound of neodymium and chlorine with the formula NdCl2.

Preparation
Neodymium(II) chloride can be prepared by reducing neodymium(III) chloride with lithium metal/naphthalene or lithium chloride in THF.

Reduction of neodymium(III) chloride with neodymium metal at temperatures above 650 °C also yields neodymium(II) chloride:
2 NdCl3 + Nd → 3 NdCl2

Structure
Neodymium(II) chloride adopts the PbCl2 (cotunnite) structure. Each Nd2+ ion is coordinated by nine Cl− ions in a tricapped trigonal prismatic arrangement. Seven of the Nd-Cl distances are in the range 2.95-3.14 Å while two are longer at 3.45 Å.

References

Chlorides
Neodymium compounds
Lanthanide halides